Rajarampuri, also known as Mahalaxmi Nagar is a suburb in the city of southern Kolhapur in southern Maharashtra, India.
It was named after its founder Chhatrapati Rajaram Maharaj the former ruler of the historic city. It comes under E ward. It is a typical residential area dotted with numerous stores trading in everything from garments to electronics and from grocery to jewelry. It is also known for tuitions for various courses and engineering classes. It also has various ancient gardens, library and temples. Dist. Judge Shamrao Ganpatrao Mandlik Park is one of the renowned society present in Rajarampuri, 14th ln. Also there is Raosaheb Mandlik Prathistan Trust's "Shri Datta Mandir" situated in Raosaheb Mandlik Colony, 8th Ln that is very pleasant and peaceful, which is established by Dr. Kirtiraj S. Mandlik. There is one Agne Mukhi Hanuman Mandir having beautiful sculpture of God Hanuman. There is one old Talim known as Rajarampuri Talim which conducts various social festivals. There is one vegetable market. There are in total 14 lanes. Rajarshi Shahu Swimming Pool is a nice Olympics size swimming pool located in Rajarampuri.

Notable people from Rajarampuri
 V. S. Khandekar: Jnanpith Awardee for Marathi literature.
 District Judge Shamrao Ganpatrao Mandlik ( Former Vice President 
 Durgesh Lingras ( Former City President Shivsena Kolhapur)Kolhapur Municipal Corporation 

Kolhapur
Neighbourhoods in Maharashtra